The Brinkley Concrete Streets are several road sections in Brinkley, Arkansas. They include one block of Ash Street (between New York and Main Streets), and several on New York Street (between Ash and Lynn Streets). They were among the first  of city streets to be paved, and followed the practice of the nearby Bankhead Highway sections, which were also built in concrete.

The roads were listed on the National Register of Historic Places in 2017.

See also
National Register of Historic Places listings in Monroe County, Arkansas

References

Roads on the National Register of Historic Places in Arkansas
Buildings and structures in Monroe County, Arkansas
National Register of Historic Places in Monroe County, Arkansas